Crouching Tiger, Hidden Dragon is a 2001 Taiwanese television series based on the novel by Wang Dulu. It is similar to Ang Lee's 2000 film adaptation but explains the story of the novel more deliberately due to its longer running time. The serial was released in the United States in 2004 as New Crouching Tiger, Hidden Dragon in a two-disc set.

Plot
Yu Jiaolong takes up kung fu with the former rebel master Jade Fox as a way to escape an undesirable arranged marriage, while simultaneously, sword master Li Mu Bai falls in love with Yu Shu Lien when she arrives to avenge the murder of her parents. When the Green Destiny Sword turns up stolen, and the notorious female thief Jade Fox arrives to finish the ordeal, the four become enmeshed in a tangle of adventure, vengeance, and betrayal.

Cast
Chiu Hsin-chih as Li Mubai
Jiang Qinqin as Yu Jiaolong
Huang Yi as Yu Xiulian
Peter Ho as Luo Xiaohu
Angus Tung as Meng Sizhao
Chen Changhai as Yu Rui
Jiang Lili as Madame Yu

Reception

Unlike the Ang Lee adaptation, which was accepted by most international consumers and became a broad success save for its Asian origins, the television serial was considered low-budget and was criticized for its lack of quality and directing.

Many English reviewers noted it was poorer in comparison to the original, and that its similarities were few and far between, such as the fight scenes being animated strangely and its direct mode of film from its television series being sub-par.

However, some have endorsed its release and support its longer storyline, detailed costumes, and general adherence to the original source material.

References

External links
 IGN review of New Crouching Tiger, Hidden Dragon 

2001 Taiwanese television series debuts
2001 Taiwanese television series endings
Taiwanese wuxia television series
Television series set in the Qing dynasty
Television shows based on Chinese novels